Fonovai Tangimana (born 	25 October 1989) is a Tongan-born Romanian rugby union football player. He plays in the wing position for professional SuperLiga club Steaua București but can also play in the centre position as well.  He currently plays for Romania's national team, the Oaks, making his international debut at the autumn tests in 2016 more specifically in a match against the Eagles.

References

External links

Fonovai Tangimana at Timișoara Saracens website

1989 births
Living people
People from Vavaʻu
Romanian people of Tongan descent
Tongan emigrants to Romania
Rugby union wings
Rugby union centres
Romanian rugby union players
Romania international rugby union players
Tongan rugby union players